Trolleybuses in Belarus form an important component of the urban public transport systems in that country.

Trolleybus systems currently exist in seven cities in Belarus. The system in Minsk, in operation since 1952, is the largest trolleybus system in the world. As of about 2005, the Minsk system had a fleet of slightly more than 1,000 trolleybuses, serving 68 routes.

Trolleybuses also serve Brest, Vitebsk, Gomel, Grodno, Mogilev and Babruysk (since 1978).

For a complete list of all trolleybus systems to have existed in Belarus, with dates of opening (and city name transliterations), see List of trolleybus systems, under Belarus.  As of May 2013, all seven trolleybus systems opened in Belarus remain in operation.

Belarus also has some manufacturers of trolleybuses, including Belkommunmash and MAZ.

See also

Trolleybuses in former Soviet Union countries
List of trolleybus systems in Russia
List of trolleybus systems in Ukraine

References

External links
 Belarusian transport

 
Transport in Belarus